This is a list of notable people from Moncton, New Brunswick. Although not everyone in this list was born in Moncton, they all live or have lived there, and have had significant connections to the community.

See also
List of people from New Brunswick

References

 
Moncton
Moncton
People from Westmorland County, New Brunswick